Barany  is a village in the administrative district of Gmina Lipno, within Lipno County, Kuyavian-Pomeranian Voivodeship, in north-central Poland.

The village has a population of 220.

Prior to World War I, the village was mostly German settlers.  A map from 1930 shows 40 families.

References

Barany